Gabriella Markoč, née Kindl (born 15 September 1979) is a retired Hungarian and Montenegrin handball player.

Achievements
Nemzeti Bajnokság I:
Winner: 2003, 2004
Magyar Kupa:
Winner: 2004
Slovenian Championship:
Winner: 2007, 2008
Slovenian Cup:
Winner: 2007, 2008
Montenegrin Championship:
Winner: 2009, 2010, 2011
Montenegrin Chup:
Winner: 2009, 2010, 2011
EHF Cup Winners' Cup:
Winner: 2010
EHF Cup:
Finalist: 1999, 2002, 2003
World Championship:
Bronze medalist: 2005
European Championship:
Winner: 2000
Bronze medalist: 2004

References
 

1979 births
Living people
People from Mohács
Hungarian female handball players
Montenegrin female handball players
Expatriate handball players
Hungarian expatriates in Slovenia
Hungarian expatriates in Montenegro
Sportspeople from Baranya County